is a women's volleyball team based in Ageo city, Saitama, Japan. It plays in V.League 1. The club was founded in 2001.
The owner of the team is Ageo Medical Group.

History
Founded in 2001.
Promoted to V.Challenge League in 2003.
Won 2010-11 V.Challenge League for the first time.
On 6 April 2014 Medics beat JT Marvelous in the V.Challenge match, winning promotion to V.Premier league for the coming season.

League results

Current squad
2021–2022 Squad as of 9 September 2021 

 Head coach:  Antônio Marcos Lerbach

Former players

Domestic players

Tomomi Nakao (2002-2009)
Ayuka Hattori (2009–2012)
Yurie Yamamoto (2010–2012)
Maiko Hanzawa (2010–2012)
Mai Seki (2008-2015)
Asuka Minamoto (2010-2015)
Saori Arita (2011–2013) (2014–2017)
Nozomi Tsuchida (2012–2016)
 Erika Araki Shinomiya (2014–2016) Transferred to Toyota Auto Body Queenseis
Yoshika Okamoto (2014–2016)
Shiho Kondo (2012–2018)
Ayaka Matsumoto (2016-2019)
Natsuko Kozasa (2012–2018)
Miku Benoki (2014–2018)
Yuki Araki (2014-2019)
Shiho Yoshimura (2012-2016)
Mami Miura (2012–2020)
Misaki Inoue (2016–2020) Transferred to Hisamitsu Springs
Miyuki Horie (2016–2021)
Risa Omuro (2012–2021)

Foreign Players

Shainah Joseph (2020–2021)

 Katarina Barun ŠušnjarKatarina Barun ŠušnjarKatarina Barun Šušnjar(2018–2020)

Rosir Calderon (2016–2017)
Kenia Carcaces (2017–2018)
 
Sidarka Núñez (2007–08)
Altagracia Mambrú (2008–09)
 
Valentina Fiorin (2011–2012)
 
Olena Ustymenko (2012–2013)
 
Nancy Metcalf (2013–2014)
Kelly Murphy (2014–2016)

References

External links
Official Website

Japanese volleyball teams
Ageo Medics